The following is a timeline of the history of the city of Caracas, Venezuela.

Prior to 18th century

 1567 – 25 July: Santiago de León de Caracas established by Spaniard Diego de Losada.
 1577 – Town becomes capital of Venezuela Province, Spanish Empire.
 1584 – St. George's Cathedral, Caracas built.
 1591 –  granted.
 1593 – Iglesia de San Francisco (church) built.
 1595 – Town captured by English troops led by George Somers and Amyas Preston
 1638 – Roman Catholic Diocese of Caracas founded.
 1641 – 11 June: Earthquake.
 1674 – Caracas Cathedral built.
 1679 – Town "pillaged by the French."
 1700 – Population: 6,000.

18th century

 1721 – University of Caracas founded.
 1763 – Measles outbreaks begin.
 1765 – Population: 12,500.
 1770 – Population: 20,000.
 1777
 City becomes capital of Captaincy General of Venezuela.
 Santa Rosalia parish established.
 1779 – City divided into eight administrative wards (barrios).
 1781 –  built.
 1782 – Theatre built.
 1787 – Real Audiencia of Caracas installed.
 1793 – Consulado (merchant guild) established.

19th century

 1802 – Population: 24,000–42,000.
 1808 – Gazeta de Caracas newspaper begins publication.
 1810 – Revolt from Spanish control.
 1811
 City becomes capital of First Republic of Venezuela.
 Divina Pastora parish established.
 1812 – 26 March: Earthquake.
 1813
 August: City taken by forces of Bolivar.
 City becomes capital of Second Republic of Venezuela.
 1814 – July: .
 1818 – Academy of music founded.
 1820 – City becomes capital of Venezuela Department of Gran Colombia.
 1821 – 29 June: Bolívar takes city.
 1835 – Academia de Dibujo y Pintura (art academy) founded (approximate date).
 1861 –  established.
 1870 – 27 April: April Revolution (Venezuela).
 1874
 National Pantheon of Venezuela established.
 Bolívar statue erected in Bolívar Square.
 1881
 Teatro Municipal de Caracas opens.
 Population: 55,638.
 1882 – Horse-drawn streetcar begins operating.
 1883
 La Guaira-Caracas railway begins operating.
  (church) built.
 Academia Venezolana Correspondiente de la Real Española established.
 1887 – Academia de Musica y Declamacion (music school) and Academia de Bellas Artes (art school) active.
 1889 – Academia Nacional de la Historia de Venezuela inaugurated.
 1891 – Population: 72,429.
 1894 – Valencia-Caracas railway begins operating.
 1895 – Electricidad de Caracas in business.
 1897 – Miraflores Palace built.

20th century

 1900 – Earthquake
 1904 - Population: 90,000.(estimate).
 1905 – National Theatre opens.
 1908 – Electric streetcar begins operating.
 1909 – El Universal newspaper in publication.
 1922 – Population: 92,212.
 1928 – Generation of 1928 anti-Gómez protest.
 1929 – Cine El Dorado (cinema) opens in 
 1931
 Caracas Athenaeum founded.
  opens.
 1937 – Municipal Commission of Town Planning established.
 1941 – Population: 269,030 city; 380,099 federal district.
 1945
 Caracas Journal newspaper begins publication.
 1947 – Caracas Stock Exchange established.
 1950
 British School established.
 Population: 495,064 city; 693,896 urban agglomeration.
 1951 – Estadio Olímpico opens.
 1952
 Aerial Tramway begins operating.
 Estadio Universitario opens.
 1953
 Radio Caracas Televisión begins broadcasting.
 Cine Radio City (cinema) opens.
 1954 – Centro Simón Bolívar Towers built
 1958 – El Mundo newspaper begins publication.
 1959 – La Rinconada Hippodrome opens in 
 1960 – University City built.
 1961 – Population: 786,710 city; 1,362,189 federal district.
 1963 – December: Christmas display of illuminated  begins.
 1966 – CorpBanca Tower built.
 1967
 29 July: 1967 Caracas earthquake.
 Simón Bolívar University and Caracas Football Club established.
 Central Bank of Venezuela Building constructed.
 1971 – Population: 1,662,627 city; 2,175,400 urban agglomeration (approximate).
 1973 – Previsora Tower and Bet-El Synagogue built.
 1974
 Poliedro de Caracas (arena) opens.
 Museo de Arte Contemporáneo de Caracas opens.
 1975
 28 October: 1975 Copa América football tournament held.
 Orquesta Sinfónica Simón Bolívar (youth orchestra) headquartered in city.
 1977 – Parque Zoológico Caricuao opens.
 1978 – National Theatre Festival begins (approximate date).
 1979 – El Diario de Caracas newspaper begins publication.
 1982 – Children's Museum of Caracas established.
 1983
 Caracas Metro begins operating.
 Teresa Carreño Theatre and Brígido Iriarte Stadium open.
  and Parque Central Complex built.
 August: 1983 Pan American Games held.
 1984 – Mercantil Tower and Provincial Tower built.
 1987 – Parque Cristal built.
 1989
 February: Protests.
 National Library of Venezuela building opens.
 1990
 Tower of David construction begins.
 Population: 1,824,892 city; 2,784,042 urban agglomeration.
 1993 – Mosque of Sheikh Ibrahim Al-Ibrahim built.
 1995 – Polar Tower II built.
 1998 – Centro San Ignacio (commercial building) opens.
 1999
 Capital District (Venezuela) established.
 Movilnet Tower, and Centro Sambil (shopping mall) built.
 2000
 Metropolitan District of Caracas created, with jurisdiction over Baruta, Chacao, El Hatillo, Libertador, and Sucre.
 Alfredo Peña becomes mayor.
 Mormon temple dedicated.

21st century

 2002 – 11 April: Demonstration.
 2004
 Juan Barreto becomes mayor.
 Estrella Roja Football Club formed.
 17 October: Fire in Parque Central Complex.
 2005 – Venezuela International Book Fair begins.
 2006
 January: World Social Forum held.
 Libertador Simón Bolívar Terminal opens.
 2007
 May: RCTV closure demonstration.
 Squatters occupy Centro Financiero Confinanzas.
 2008
 Antonio Ledezma becomes mayor.
 Real Esppor football club formed.
 2010 – Metrocable (gondola) begins operating.
 2011 – Population: 2,104,423.
 2012 – 20 August: Yare prison riot.
 2014 – February: 2014–2018 Venezuelan protests begin.
 2015 - Population: 2,082,130.
 2017 - July: Strike in protest against president Maduro.
 2019 - January: Venezuelan Presidential crisis begins, ensuing chaos in Caracas

See also
 Caracas history
 
 Capital District (Venezuela)
 List of newspapers in Venezuela
 List of universities in Caracas
 History of Venezuela

References

This article incorporates information from the Spanish Wikipedia.

Bibliography

Published in the 19th century
 
 
 
 
 

Published in the 20th century

External links

 Items related to Caracas, various dates (via Digital Public Library of America)
 Items related to Caracas, various dates (via Europeana)

 
Caracas
Timeline of Caracas
Years in Venezuela
Caracas